Mamta Rakesh is an Indian politician from Uttarakhand and a two term Member of the Uttarakhand Legislative Assembly. Mamta represents the Bhagwanpur (Uttarakhand Assembly constituency). Mamta is a member of the Indian National Congress.

Elections contested

References

Living people
20th-century Indian politicians
Indian National Congress politicians from Uttarakhand
People from Haridwar district
Women in Uttarakhand politics
Year of birth missing (living people)
Uttarakhand MLAs 2012–2017
Uttarakhand MLAs 2017–2022
Uttarakhand MLAs 2022–2027
21st-century Indian women politicians